The 2011 FIM Individual Ice Racing World Championship will be the 2011 version of FIM Individual Ice Racing World Championship season. The world champion will be determined in eight finals hosted in four cities between 5 February and 27 March 2011.

Qualification 

In three Qualifying Rounds will started 48 riders from 13 nationan federation and to Final series will qualify top 5 from each meetings and 6th placed riders from QR1 and QR2.

Riders 
There will be eighteen permanent riders. Seventeen riders was qualify from the Qualifying Rounds, and one permanent Wild Card will be nominatedand soon. There are no Wild Card and additional Track Reserve riders.

In all cases of absence of a scheduled rider, the draw number 17 track reserve rider shall be elevated for that meeting to take the place of that missing scheduled rider. In the case that there are 2 missing scheduled riders, then both track reserve riders (draw numbers 17 and 18) are elevated.

In the case that a track reserve rider is brought up to the level of a scheduled rider, and time allows, a rider substitute shall be nominated as track reserve rider, according to his placing on the Substitute list of that year. The Substitute list will be published by the CCP Executive Secretariat with the ballot of the first Final.

A starting position draw for each final meeting will be balloted by the FIM.

Track reserves 
After each Final, the 2 track reserve riders will become scheduled riders in the next Final, even if they have taken part in the Final where they are track reserve riders. Therefore, the 2 lowest point score riders (not being the 2 track reserve riders from that Final) on the Intermediate Classification will become track reserve in the next Final. The best placed rider will be the 1st track reserve rider with draw number 17 and the 2nd rider will be the 2nd track reserve with draw number 18.

Qualified riders 
Top six riders from QR1 in Sankt Johann, Austria:
  Sergey Karachintsev
  Franz Zorn
  Ivan Ivanov
  Dmitri Bulankin
  Stefan Pletschacher
  Mats JarfTR
Top six riders from QR2 in Sanok, Poland:
  Nikolay Krasnikov
  Daniil Ivanov
  Stefan Svensson
  Igor Kononov
  Grzegorz Knapp
  Antonín Klatovský, Jr.TR
Top five riders from QR3 in Saalfelden, Austria:a
  Dmitry Khomitsevich
  Vitaly Khomitsevich
  Harald Simon
  Günther Bauer
  Peter Koij
One rider nominated by FIM:
  Johnny Tuinstra

Notes:
TR. Jarf and Klatovský were qualify to the Final One (Day One) as a track reserve riders
a. QR3 hosted in Austria was co-organized by the Dutch federation

Qualified substitute 
  René Stellingwerf
  Jan Klatovský

Final Series

Classification 

The World Champion will be the rider having collected the most points at the end of the Championship. The track reserve riders are taken into account on the Final Overall Classification.

In case of one or more ties on the Intermediate Classification of the Championship, the following will apply:
 Best place in the last Final run.
In case of riders involved in a tie on the Final Overall Classification at the end of the Championship, the following will apply:
 Run-off for 1st, 2nd and 3rd place.
 Best place in the last Final meeting.

See also 
 2011 Team Ice Racing World Championship
 2011 Speedway Grand Prix in classic speedway

References 

Ice speedway competitions
World Individual